The 1998–99 Toronto Maple Leafs season was the franchise's 82nd season. Two moves occurred this season. First, the club moved from the Western to the Eastern Conference of the National Hockey League (NHL). Secondly, the club moved from Maple Leaf Gardens to the new Air Canada Centre. Toronto qualified for the Stanley Cup playoffs and made it to the Eastern Conference Finals before losing to the Buffalo Sabres.

Off-season
The Toronto Maple Leafs moved from the Central Division of the Western Conference to the Northeast Division of the Eastern Conference.

Regular season
The 1998–99 season was a tremendous improvement for the Maple Leafs over the 1997–98 season and the team got plenty of help from its new members, including Bryan Berard, Sylvain Cote, Curtis Joseph, Alexander Karpovtsev (who led the NHL in plus-minus with +39, but was not eligible for the NHL Plus-Minus Award because he played just 58 games), Yanic Perreault and Steve Thomas (who finished second on the team in points, with 73). Former Vancouver Canucks head coach Pat Quinn replaced Mike Murphy as Toronto's head coach. Six Maple Leafs scored 20 or more goals. Toronto set a club record for most regular season wins (45) and earned 97 points to finish second in the Northeast Division and fourth in the Eastern Conference. They led the NHL in most goals for, with 268, and were the only team to score 200 or more even-strength goals.

On November 12, 1998, the Maple Leafs defeated the Chicago Blackhawks 10–3 away. Mats Sundin recorded a hat trick in the game, which was the first regular season game in which the Leafs had scored ten goals since February 17, 1989, when they defeated the New York Rangers 10–6 away.

Maple Leaf Gardens
 On February 13, 1999, the Maple Leafs ended a 67-year tradition when they played their last game at Maple Leaf Gardens. The team lost 6–2 to the Chicago Blackhawks. Former Maple Leaf Doug Gilmour scored a fluke goal in that game and notorious tough guy Bob Probert scored the final NHL goal in Gardens history in the game's third period. During the emotional post-game ceremony, legendary Canadian singer Anne Murray performed "The Maple Leaf Forever" while wearing a Toronto jersey. The Leafs were the last of the Original Six teams to leave their Original Six-era arena, three years after the Canadiens did so.

Air Canada Centre
 The first Maple Leafs home game took place on February 20, 1999, against the Montreal Canadiens, won by the Leafs 3–2 on an overtime goal by Steve Thomas.

Season standings

Schedule and results

Playoffs

Eastern Conference Finals
The Maple Leafs and Buffalo Sabres met in the Eastern Conference Finals. The Maple Leafs were coming off a six-game series win over the Pittsburgh Penguins, while the Sabres were coming off a six-game series win themselves, over the Boston Bruins. Toronto was having its best playoff since 1994, when they last made a Conference Final series. Buffalo, meanwhile, was in the third round for the second consecutive year.

With the series victory, the Sabres advanced to the Stanley Cup Finals for the first time in 24 years.

Player statistics

Regular season
Scoring

Goaltending

Playoffs
Scoring

Goaltending

Awards and honors
 Curtis Joseph, Runner-up, Vezina Trophy.
 Curtis Joseph, Runner-up, Lester B. Trophy.
 Pat Quinn, Runner-Up, Jack Adams Trophy.

Transactions
The Maple Leafs have been involved in the following transactions during the 1998-99 season.

Trades

Waivers

Expansion Draft

Free agents

Draft picks
Toronto's draft picks at the 1998 NHL Entry Draft held at the Marine Midland Arena in Buffalo, New York.

References
Bibliography
 
 Maple Leafs on Hockey Database

Toronto Maple Leafs season, 1998-99
Toronto Maple Leafs seasons
Toronto